Antoine Ponroy (born 15 April 1986) is a French footballer who currently plays as a centre-back for FC Fleury 91.

References

Antoine Ponroy profile at foot-national.com

1986 births
Living people
Footballers from Rouen
French footballers
Association football defenders
Stade Rennais F.C. players
Rangers F.C. players
AS Cannes players
AS Beauvais Oise players
Thonon Evian Grand Genève F.C. players
Paris FC players
Stade Lavallois players
Vannes OC players
US Orléans players
Football Bourg-en-Bresse Péronnas 01 players
Ligue 2 players
Championnat National players
FC Fleury 91 players